Dr. Edith Dankwa is an entrepreneur, consultant and CEO of the Business and Financial Times Limited. Edith is known for rendering business advisory services and has served as a market entry strategist for businesses that seek to extend their operations to Africa. She manages the Business Times Africa Magazine (BT), Energy Today Magazine (ET) and the Business & Financial Times (B&FT) newspaper under her company umbrella, the Business and Financial Times Limited.

Education 
She obtained her Bachelor of Arts degree in Management Studies from the University of Cape Coast, and further pursued an Executive MBA from the GIMPA Business School. She has a Post Graduate Diploma in Marketing from the Chartered Institute of Marketing, Ghana and a Post Graduate Certificate in Newspaper Management from Inwent International Institute of Journalism, Germany. Edith is also a fellow of the Institute of Certified Economist of Ghana and has a doctoral degree in Business Administration (International Business) from the Walden University in the USA.

Career 
Dr. Dankwa has served on the boards of TV3, the International Chamber of Commerce (Ghana), Ghana News Agency and Unilever Ghana. She is also a founding member of the Executive Women Network, a chairperson of the African Business Leaders Foundation and the president of the Institute for Development and Policy.

Achievements and awards 

 Dr. Dankwa’s received an award in 2012 by the Entrepreneurs Foundation of Ghana, as the ‘Best Print Media Entrepreneur’ for the year 2011.
 eTV Ghana recognised her as one of the 100 Most Influential Personalities in Ghana for 2013.
 Top 100 Most Inspirational Women of the Year by Glitz Awards

References 

21st-century Ghanaian businesswomen
21st-century Ghanaian businesspeople
Ghanaian chief executives
Year of birth missing (living people)
Living people
Place of birth missing (living people)
University of Cape Coast alumni
Ghana Institute of Management and Public Administration alumni
Walden University alumni